Aspen Lawn, also known as V.T. Drewey Farm and Rawles Tract, is a historic plantation house located near Drewryville, Southampton County, Virginia. It was built about 1798, and is a two-story, five-bay, double pile timber frame dwelling. It has a standing seam metal hipped roof, four exterior end chimneys, and sits on a brick foundation.  The house has Greek Revival and Federal design elements.  The front facade features an imposing, two-story, pedimented portico sheltering the main entrance. Also on the property are the contributing tobacco barn, and the ruins of a barn and smokehouse.

It was listed on the National Register of Historic Places in 2002.

References

Plantation houses in Virginia
Houses on the National Register of Historic Places in Virginia
Greek Revival houses in Virginia
Federal architecture in Virginia
Houses completed in 1798
Houses in Southampton County, Virginia
National Register of Historic Places in Southampton County, Virginia
1798 establishments in Virginia